Seraphim Masi (1797 - February 27, 1884) was an American silversmith, active in Washington, D.C. He is best known for creating the second Treaty Seal of the United States in 1825.

Early life
Seraphim Masi was born in Frascati, Italy.

Career
Masi worked from 1822-1870 as a silversmith and jeweler in Washington. In 1822 he advertised in the Washington Directory as a "Watchmaker and Jeweler" who sold silver work, spectacles and "a variety of other fancy goods." In 1827 he was listed in the city directory as having his shop on the north side of Pennsylvania Avenue between 4 1/2 and 6 West. A letter from the United States Treasury Department, dated March 22, 1884, i.e., shortly after his death, appears to indicate that he had been receiving a pension as a veteran of the War of 1812.

Masi's most famous work was the second Treaty Seal of the United States, 1825, his version of the Great Seal of the United States. It was used for making red-wax pendant seals for treaties until 1871, when the government ceased using pendant seals and retired the die. On May 5, 1825, the United States Department of State paid him $406 "for Treaty Boxes & a great Seal." It is now in the National Archives collection. Each wax pendant seal was protected within a circular metal skippet, usually sterling silver, although a few were solid gold; the skippet cover bore a replica of the seal. In addition to his other creations, Masi also held a contract to attend, regulate, and repair the clocks of the United States Senate.

His work is collected in the De Young Museum, National Archives, Winterthur Museum, and Yale University Art Gallery.

Personal life and death

Masi married Catherine Agnes Bradford on November 8, 1825, and was buried in the Mount Olivet Cemetery in Washington.

References
 "Seraphim Masi", American Silversmiths.
 "Seraphim Masi", Find-a-Grave.
 Kovels' American Silver Marks, Ralph M. Kovel, Crown Publishers, 1989, page 242.
 "Seraphim Masi", Silver Flatware Fashions.
 "Report of the Secretary of the Senate of Expenditures from the contingent fund of the Senate", January 4, 1847, page 7, in the United States Congressional Serial Set, Volume 494. 
 Letter from the United States Treasury Department, dated March 22, 1884.

External links

1797 births
1884 deaths
American silversmiths
People from Lazio
Burials at Mount Olivet Cemetery (Washington, D.C.)